MCSA may refer to:

The Mountain Club of South Africa
Moscow, Camden and San Augustine Railroad
Monte Carlo Statistical Analysis - CEO: Mizuno, E.Y.
MC Sailing Association
Methodist Church of Southern Africa
Motor Current Signature Analysis
Microsoft Certified Systems Administrator, or Microsoft Certified Solutions Associate, retired components of the Microsoft Certified Professional Program